Team Xtreme was an auto racing team that competed in the Indy Racing League from 1999 to 2001. Founded by former F2000 and SCCA racer John Hollansworth Jr., the team ran three full seasons in the series. The team is best known for introducing Brazilian racer Airton Daré to the series, who scored a best result of 2nd for the team in 2000 and took rookie of the year honors the same year. Despite Daré finishing 10th overall in the series in 2001, the team was forced to fold after failing to find a sponsor for 2002.

Complete IRL IndyCar Series results 
(key) (Results in bold indicate pole position; results in italics indicate fastest lap)

 The 1999 VisionAire 500K at Charlotte was cancelled after 79 laps due to spectator fatalities.

References 

1999 establishments in the United States
American auto racing teams
IndyCar Series teams
2001 disestablishments in the United States